Zhuge Liang or Chu-ko Liang (181 – September 234), courtesy name Kǒngmíng or K'ung-ming was a Chinese statesman and military strategist. He was chancellor and later regent of the state of Shu Han during the Three Kingdoms period. He is recognised as the most accomplished strategist of his era, and has been compared to Sun Tzu, the author of The Art of War. His reputation as an intelligent and learned scholar grew even while he was living in relative seclusion, earning him the nickname "Wolong" or "Fulong", meaning "Crouching Dragon" or "Sleeping Dragon". Zhuge Liang is often depicted wearing a Taoist robe and holding a hand fan made of crane feathers.

Zhuge Liang was a Confucian-oriented "Legalist". He liked to compare himself to the sage minister Guan Zhong and Yue Yi developing Shu's agriculture and industry to become a regional power, and attached great importance to the works of Shen Buhai and Han Fei, refusing to indulge local elites and adopting strict, but fair and clear laws. In remembrance of his governance, local people maintained shrines to him for ages. His name has become synonymous with wisdom and strategy in Chinese culture. Zhuge Liang is depicted in the Wu Shuang Pu (Table of Peerless Heroes) by Jin Guliang.

Early life
Zhuge Liang was born in 181 in Yangdu County, Langya Commandery (present-day Yishui, Shandong Province). His family name, Zhuge, is a two-character Chinese compound family name. His father Zhuge Gui died when he was still young, and he was raised by Zhuge Xuan (a cousin of Zhuge Gui) in Yuzhang Commandery. When Zhuge Xuan was driven out of Yuzhang Commandery in 195, Zhuge Liang followed Zhuge Xuan to live with his friend, Liu Biao, the governor of Jing Province.

Zhuge Liang grew to be a tall man. He enjoyed reciting the Liangfu Yin, a folk song popular in Shandong, his birthplace. He had a habit of comparing himself to the sage minister Guan Zhong and military leader Yue Yi. Although few people took him seriously, Zhuge Liang developed close friendships with influential members of the local literati such as Xu Shu, Cui Zhouping, Meng Jian and Shi Tao. Zhuge Liang also maintained close relations with other well-known intellectuals such as Sima Hui, Pang Degong and Huang Chengyan. Sima Hui once compared Zhuge Liang to a sleeping dragon.

Huang Chengyan once told Zhuge Liang, "I heard that you're seeking a spouse. I've an ugly daughter with yellow hair and dark complexion, but her talent matches yours." Zhuge Liang agreed and married Huang Chengyan's daughter.

Service under Liu Bei 

When Liu Bei was residing at Xinye County and taking shelter under Jing Province's governor, Liu Biao, he visited Sima Hui, who told him, "Confucian academics and common scholars, how much do they know about current affairs? Those who analyse current affairs well are the elites. Crouching Dragon and Young Phoenix are the only ones in this region." Sima Hui was referring to Zhuge Liang, whose nickname was "Crouching Dragon"; and Pang Tong, whose nickname could be translated as "Young Phoenix" or "Fledgling Phoenix".

Xu Shu later recommended Zhuge Liang to Liu Bei again, and Liu wanted to ask Xu to invite Zhuge to meet him. However, Xu Shu replied, "You must visit this man in person. He cannot be invited to meet you." Liu Bei succeeded in recruiting Zhuge Liang in 207 after paying three personal visits. This is contradicted in the later Annotations by Pei Songzhi which claim Zhuge Liang visited him first. Nonetheless, "Three visits to the cottage" became a very famous classical reference in China.

Yi Zhongtian suggested that both the records in Sanguozhi and Weilue are the truth. The chronological order should be: Zhuge Liang approached Liu Bei first to demonstrate his wisdom. Liu Bei, having recognized Liang's talent, personally visited Liang three times to have further discussions.
The novel Romance of the Three Kingdoms portrays Liu Bei's three visits with many fictional mystic events, and narrates that only at the third visit that Liu Bei managed to meet Zhuge Liang and listened to his Longzhong Plan. However the truth is, Liu Bei managed to meet Liang in all three visits, and there were probably more visits with further discussions of the Longzhong Plan before Zhuge Liang finally decided to officially offer his services.

Zhuge Liang presented the Longzhong Plan to Liu Bei and left his residence to follow Liu. Afterwards, Liu Bei became very close to Zhuge Liang and often had discussions with him. Guan Yu and Zhang Fei were displeased with their relationship and complained about it. Liu Bei explained, "Now that I have Kongming, I am like a fish that has found water. I hope you'll stop making unpleasant remarks." Guan Yu and Zhang Fei then stopped complaining.

As a diplomat

In 208, Liu Biao died and was succeeded by his younger son, Liu Cong, who surrendered Jing Province to Cao Cao. When Liu Bei heard of Liu Cong's surrender, he led his followers (both troops and civilians) on an exodus southward to Xiakou, and suffered a severe defeat by Cao Cao's forces in a brief skirmish at the Battle of Changban along the way. While in Xiakou, Liu Bei sent Zhuge Liang to follow Lu Su to Jiangdong to discuss the formation of an alliance between him and Sun Quan, and Liang managed to have a meeting with Sun Quan in Chaisang.

Zhuge Liang, being able to gauge Sun Quan's personality, decided to provoke Sun Quan by telling Sun just to surrender if he could not resist Cao Wei. Liang also explained that although Liu Bei was also weaker than Cao Cao, he would fight to the death instead of surrendering; moreover, Liu Bei and his allies still retained some significant forces despite the defeat at Changban, and Cao Cao's army was not as strong as it appeared to be. Sun Quan was pleased with Zhuge Liang's arguments, and, together with Lu Su's analysis of the political situation and Zhou Yu's analysis of the weaknesses in Cao Cao's army, agreed to ally with Liu Bei in resisting Cao Cao. Zhuge Liang returned to Liu Bei's camp with Sun Quan's envoy, Lu Su, to make preparations for the upcoming war.

As a logistics officer

In late 208, the allied armies of Liu Bei and Sun Quan scored a decisive victory over Cao Cao's forces at the Battle of Red Cliffs. Cao Cao retreated to Ye city, while Liu Bei proceeded to conquer territories in Jiangnan, covering most of southern Jing Province. Zhuge Liang was appointed Military Advisor General of the Household. He was put in charge of governing Lingling (present day Yongzhou, Hunan), Guiyang and Changsha commanderies and collecting taxes to fund the military.

In 211, Liu Zhang, governor of Yi Province (covering present-day Sichuan and Chongqing), requested aid from Liu Bei in attacking Zhang Lu in Hanzhong Commandery. Liu Bei left Zhuge Liang, Guan Yu, Zhang Fei and others in charge of Jing Province while he led an army into Yi Province. Liu Bei promptly agreed to Liu Zhang's proposal, but secretly planned to take over Liu Zhang's land. The following year, Liu Zhang discovered Liu Bei's intention, and the two turned hostile and waged war on each other. Zhuge Liang, Zhang Fei and Zhao Yun led separate forces to reinforce Liu Bei in the attack on Yi Province's capital, Chengdu, while Guan Yu stayed behind to guard Jing Province. In 214, Liu Zhang surrendered and Liu Bei took control of Yi Province.

Liu Bei appointed Zhuge Liang as Military Advisor General and let him administer affairs of his personal office (office of the General of the Left). Whenever Liu Bei embarked on military campaigns, Zhuge Liang remained to defend Chengdu and ensured a steady flow of supply of troops and provisions. In 221, in response to Cao Pi's usurping of Emperor Xian's throne, Liu Bei's subordinates advised him to declare himself emperor. After initially refusing, Liu Bei was eventually persuaded by Zhuge Liang to do so and became ruler of Shu Han. Liu Bei named Zhuge Liang his chancellor and put him in charge of the imperial agency where Zhuge assumed the functions of the head of the imperial secretariat. Zhuge Liang was appointed Colonel-Director of Retainers after Zhang Fei's death.

Service under Liu Shan

In the spring of 223, Liu Bei retreated to Yong'an (present-day Fengjie County, Chongqing) after his defeat at the Battle of Xiaoting and became seriously ill. He summoned Zhuge Liang from Chengdu and said to him, "You're ten times more talented than Cao Pi, and capable of both securing the country and accomplishing our great mission. If my son can be assisted, then assist him. If he proves incompetent, then you may take over the throne." Zhuge Liang replied tearfully, "I'll do my utmost and serve with unwavering loyalty until death." Liu Bei then ordered his son, Liu Shan, to administer state affairs together with Zhuge Liang and regard Zhuge as his father.

There are controversies over the last statement of Liu Bei on Zhuge Liang's "take over the throne" (君可自取). Yi Zhongtian in his "Analysis of the Three Kingdoms" presented several interpretations of Liu Bei's message. Chen Shou commented that Liu Bei wholeheartly trusted Zhuge Liang and permitted Liang to "take over" literally. Some argued that Liu Bei said that only to test Zhuge Liang's loyalty as his brother, Zhuge Jin, was working for Eastern Wu. Other commented that the "take over the throne" part did not mean Zhuge Liang was allowed take the throne for himself, but he was permitted to, when the situation demanded, replace Liu Shan with other of Liu Bei's living sons such as Liu Yong and Liu Li.

Holding power as a regent
After Liu Bei's death, Liu Shan ascended to the throne of Shu Han. He granted Zhuge Liang the title "Marquis of Wu District" and created an office for him as a Chancellor. Not long later, Zhuge Liang was appointed Governor of Yi Province – the region which included most of Shu Han's territory.

Being both the Chancellor (directly managing the bureaucrat officers) and provincial governor (directly managing the common people) meant that both the magistrates and common people, i.e. all of the state affairs, were in the hand of Zhuge Liang. Having an independent Chancellery Office (with attached independent subordinates) meant that Zhuge Liang's authority was relatively independent of the emperor's authority. In other words, just like in Sanguozhi said, all of Shu Han's affairs, trivial or vital, were directly handled by Zhuge Liang, and the emperor Liu Shan was just a nominal leader. Moreover, the emperor himself was strictly educated and supervised by Zhuge Liang. This situation was maintained until Liang's death.

There are many attempts who tried to explain why Zhuge Liang refused to return the authority to Liu Shan. Yi Zhongtian proposed three reasons:
 Zhuge Liang supported the model of the emperor only indirectly lead the country and have a Chancellor to handle the affairs in his name, similar to the situation at the early period of Western Han. On Liang's opinion, if the emperor directly handled the affairs, then there is no one to be blamed if problems occurred, but if a representative Chancellor handled things then the emperor could have an interpellation against the Chancellor in the case of failure.
 Zhuge Liang stubbornly thought that Liu Shan was not experienced enough to directly handle the state affairs, hence Liang decided to do things himself to make sure no mistakes happened.
 The situation of Shu Han was indeed very complicated at that time which required extremely well-planned solutions. An inexperienced Liu Shan could not handle such challenging problems, but Zhuge Liang could.

Economic reforms
Yi Province's wealthy families, uncurbed by the previous governors, freely exploited the common people and had an extravagant life. As a result, poverty was widespread, and economical-political reform was the most important concern for Zhuge Liang. A robust economic foundation was also necessary to enhance the people's loyalty to Shu Han regime and properly support the future's expeditions against Cao Wei. Therefore, Zhuge Liang made it clear that the core value of his policy was to stabilize and improve the life of the people.

Zhuge Liang's new policies was enacted right from the time of Liu Bei and continued in the time of Liu Shan. He purged the corrupted officials, relieved taxes, and restricted the nobilities's abuse of power against the common people. Forced labours and military mobilization were also reduced and rescheduled to avoid the disruption of agriculture activities, and Cao Cao's tuntian system was implemented extensively to increase food production output. Agriculture dykes were significantly rebuilt and repaired, including the famous Zhuge dyke northern of Chengdu. Thanks to the reform, Shu Han agriculture production grew significantly and was able to sustain her military activities.

Salt manufacture, silk production, and steelmaking – three notable economic activities of Shu region – also attracted Zhuge Liang's attention. Liu Bei, following the proposal of Zhuge Liang, created specialized bureaus for salt and steelmaking management, first directed by Wang Lian and Zhang Yi, respectively. A specialized silk management bureau was also established, hence Chengdu was named as "the city of Silk". Sanguozhi reported that salt production in Shu Han was highly prosperous and generated significant income to the government. Fu Yuan, a well-known local metalsmith, was entrusted by Zhuge Liang in metallurgy research and managed to improve the techniques in crafting steel weapons for Shu Han army. Silk production also had significant growth, at the end of Shu Han regime it managed to accumulated 200,000 pieces of silk in the national treasure. Zhuge Liang's family plantation also had 800 mulberry plants for silkworm feeding.

Due to political turmoil, monetary systems at the end of the Han dynasty were in severe turbulence. When establishing themselves in the Yi Province, Liu Bei and Zhuge Liang, following the advice of Liu Ba, enacted successful monetary reforms. The new Shu Han currency was not only smoothly circulated within its borders, but also popular in the neighboring Jing province. Meanwhile, similar policies of Cao Cao, Cao Pi, Cao Rui and Sun Quan were marred by difficulties and produced limited results.

Legal and moral reforms
Zhuge Liang strongly supported the rule of law in Shu Han. Yi Zhongtian commented that "Rule of Laws" together with "Nominal rule of the Monarch and direct rule of the Chancellor" are two important legacy of Zhuge Liang which were pitifully forgotten by many people.

After Liu Bei entered Yi province, Zhuge Liang, together with Fa Zheng, Liu Ba, Li Yan and Yi Ji, wrote the legal codes for Shu Han.

In order to curb the corruption and associated decadences of the local Yi nobility, Zhuge Liang enacted a Legalist policy with strict but fair and transparent laws, and restricted the power of wealthy families. Zhuge Liang was willing to punish high-ranked magistrates such as Li Yan, Liang's close associates such as Ma Su, and even willing to demote himself to keep the legal orders. However Liang also refrained from abusing punishment and required extreme caution in law enforcement. Xi Zuochi praised Liang's policy of legal rule, that "since the era of Qin and Han there had been no one as equal." Even punished magistrates like Li Yan and Liao Li put Zhuge Liang in high regards and strongly believed that Liang would re-employ them after the punishment was enough.

Zhuge Liang also promoted moral conduct and himself had a strict and stoic life as a model. He did not own excessive assets, refrained from luxurious spending, relied mainly on government salary. Shu Han's magistrates, like Deng Zhi, Fei Yi, Jiang Wei, Zhang Yi also followed suit, strictly abided by the law and the moral codes, enabled the Shu government to maintain a high level of transparency and integrity. Yi Zhongtian praised Shu Han as the best model of "rational rule" amongst the Three Kingdoms, and it is the incorruptibility and transparency of Zhuge Liang and his associates that kept Shu Han from collapsing in disregard of the heavy expenditure burden.

Not everybody was happy with such Legalist policy. Guo Chong's comment on Liang's policy was that it was "cruel" and "exploitative", that "everybody from the noble to the commoner" was upset. Pei Songzhi disagreed with such comments because Zhuge Liang's law enforcement was appropriate and could never be "exploitative". That also contradicted Chen Shou's comment that "nobody was upset despite the strict laws". Yi Zhongtian commented that both contradicted assessments are correct, as Shu people were happy about Liang's fairness and transparency, but some of them were also upset about Liang's overstrictness. Moreover, Zhuge Liang's fairness and legal rule inevitably suppressed the local nobility, prevented them from abusing their power and manipulate politics and public opinion. That is the reason why many of the local Shu intellegistia tacitly endorsed the invasion of Wei against Shu, although they also respected Zhuge Liang. This is supported by contemporary sources, including Zhang Wen and Sun Quan. Yuan Zhun of the Jin dynasty also highly appraised Zhuge Liang's administration skills and popularity, where people would still sing praises to Zhuge Liang decades after his death.

Education and talents enrollment policy
Zhuge Liang highly appreciated talents, hence he paid strong attention to education in order to cultivate and recruit more talented magistrates for Shu Han government. Liang established a position of Aide of Learning Encouragement (勸斈從事), held by many prominent local intelligentsia such as Qiao Zhou. Qiao Zhou held this post for a very long time and was very influential; one of his students, Chen Shou, was the author of Sanguozhi. Later Zhuge Liang established a Great Education Residence (太斈府), a training facility using Confucian literature works as textbooks. Liang also created many "reading book residences" both in Chengdu and in the frontline during the northern expeditions; such facilities functioned as places for discussions of various topics, and via such discussions talented people could be discovered and recruited. Yao Tian, Shu Han's governor of Guanghan district, managed to recommend many talents to the government, hence he received lavish praise from Zhuge Liang.

Zhuge Liang also established "Discussion Bureau" mechanism to gather all the discussions of a certain policy, and encourage the magistrate to accept the criticisms of their subordinates to make a good decisions, and also to utilize all the talents of employees. Zhuge Liang carried out a meritocracy policy, promoted and assessed people based on what they did and could do rather than their fame or background.

Diplomatic missions in Eastern Wu

At the same time, the commanderies in Nanzhong rebelled against Shu, but Zhuge Liang did not send troops to suppress the revolt as Liu Bei's death was still recent. Liu Bei had been persuaded after his defeat by Lu Xun that an alliance with Wu was necessary. Zhuge sent Deng Zhi and Chen Zhen to make peace with Eastern Wu and reentered an alliance with Wu. Zhuge Liang would consistently send envoys to Wu to improve diplomatic relations between the two states.

In 229, Sun Quan proclaimed himself as emperor. This act angered many of the Shu Han court officials who considered the rulers of Shu Han, direct descendants of former Han dynasty, were the only ones could have legitimate claim of the imperial throne. Some of Shu Han's officials even suggested severing the ties between Shu and Wu. However Zhuge Liang commented that Shu-Wu alliance was still necessary, hence Sun Quan's "treachery" could be temporarily left aside. A Shu Han emissary was sent to congratulate Sun Quan and strengthen the relationship between two allies.

Southern Campaign

During his reign as regent, Zhuge Liang set Shu's objective as the restoration of the Han dynasty, which, from Shu's point of view, had been usurped by the state of Cao Wei. He felt that in order to attack Wei, a complete unification of Shu was first needed. Zhuge Liang was worried that the local clans would work with the Nanman tribes in Nanzhong to stage a revolt. Fearing the possibility that the peasants might rebel and press into areas surrounding the capital Chengdu while he was attacking Wei in the north, Zhuge Liang decided to pacify the southern tribes first.

In the spring of 225, regional clans, including Yong, Gao, Zhu and Meng, had taken control of some cities in the south, so Zhuge Liang led an expedition force to Nanzhong. Ma Su proposed that they should attempt to win the hearts of the Nanman and rally their support instead of using military force to subdue them. Zhuge Liang heeded Ma Su's advice and defeated the rebel leader, Meng Huo, on seven occasions, as it was claimed in later histories such as the Chronicles of Huayang. He released Meng Huo each time in order to achieve Meng's genuine surrender. The story about Meng Huo's seven captures is recently questioned by many modern academics, including historians such as Miao Yue, Tan Liangxiao, and Zhang Hualan.

Realising he had no chance to win, Meng Huo pledged allegiance to Shu, and was appointed by Zhuge Liang as governor of the region to keep the populace content and secure the southern Shu border. This would ensure that the future Northern Expeditions would proceed without internal disruptions. Rich and abundant resources acquired from Nanzhong were used to fund Shu's military and the state became more prosperous.

Northern Expeditions and death

After pacifying the Nanman, Zhuge Liang ordered the Shu military to make preparations for a large scale offensive on Wei. In 227, while in Hanzhong, he wrote a memorial, titled Chu Shi Biao, to Liu Shan, stating his rationale for the campaign and giving advice to the emperor on good governance. From 228 until his death in September 234, Zhuge Liang launched a total of five Northern Expeditions against Wei, all except one of which failed. During the first Northern Expedition, Zhuge Liang persuaded Jiang Wei, a young Wei military officer, to surrender and defect to his side. Jiang Wei became a prominent general of Shu later and continued Zhuge Liang's legacy of an aggressive foreign policy against Wei. The other permanent gains by Shu were the conquests of the impoverished Wudu and Yinping commanderies, as well as the relocation of Wei citizens to Shu territories on occasion. During the first expedition the veteran commander Wei Yan proposed to lead a detachment of 10,000 troops to launch a surprise attack through Ziwu Valley. Such a plan was highly risky, but in the case of success it could result in a decisive victory. The plan was rejected by an overcautious Zhuge Liang, which upset Wei Yan.

The first expedition took Cao Wei by surprise and initially proceeded smoothly, however Shu Han troops commanded by Ma Su suffered a strategic defeat at battle of Jieting, resulting in the total failure of the expedition. Zhuge Liang, as a punishment, had Ma Su executed, and had himself demoted by three levels. In second expedition, Shu army launched an unsuccessful attack at the key fortress Chencang and had to withdraw when Wei reinforcements arrived. The pursuing Wei general Wang Shuang was killed by a Shu ambush, though. The third expedition managed to capture Wudu and Yinping, two depopulated commanderies used as military bridgeheads for further attacks. Cao Wei tried a counter-attack in 230, which also ended in failure.

The fourth expedition (231) marked the first deployment of wooden oxen for supply transportation, and the first time Zhuge Liang met Sima Yi in the battlefield. Zhuge Liang sent the bulk of his army to Mount Qi and lead a detachment to Shanggui for grain harvest. Guo Huai and Fei Yan's attempt of intervention ended in failure and Shu forces managed to harvest most of the wheat. Sima Yi decided to use the Fabian strategy and kept the defensive stance. Zhuge Liang retreated to Lucheng at the eastern side of Mount Qi to lure Sima Yi. The also cautious Sima Yi initially did not take the bait, but relented under the pressure of his subordinates. Cao Wei's attack ended in a disaster, though, hence Sima Yi resumed his defensive stance, this time persistently. Zhuge Liang could not exploit his victory with a major offensive due to a dwindling food supply as adverse weather prevented Shu's logistics from delivering materiel on schedule. Shu troops had no choice but a total retreat, although they managed to kill general Zhang He in another ambush.

Learning from the experiences, Zhuge Liang spent great efforts in mitigating the logistic problem of the Shu army. He improved the wooden ox into the flowing horse, build an extraordinary huge supply storage facility, and carried out large-scale agriculture production in the northern area. He also successfully asked for a coordinated attack from Eastern Wu. After two years of preparation, in 234 Liang launched his last expedition. The Shu army garrisoned at the Wuzhang Plain (near modern-day Baoji, Shaanxi) and implemented military plantation (tuntian) here for long-term food supplement. From the Cao Wei side, Sima Yi again persistently adapted the Fabian strategy and managed to quell the protest from his subordinate. Zhuge Liang attempted to make many provocations but all failed. Straining his energy on military matters big and small, Zhuge Liang fell seriously ill and eventually died in camp at the age of 53. Before his death, Zhuge Liang recommended Jiang Wan and Fei Yi to succeed him as regent of Shu.

Sima Yi, hearing the news of Zhuge Liang's death and Shu army's subsequent withdrawal, quickly launched a pursuit. However the Shu rearguard feigned a counterattack, which fooled the overcautious Sima Yi into believing that Zhuge Liang was still alive and had planned an ambush. The Wei army halted and the Shu army successfully retreated. That incident gave rise to the popular saying "A dead Zhuge (Liang) scared away a living Zhongda." When told of the saying, Sima Yi replied: "I can predict the thoughts of the living but I can't predict those of the dead."

Burial
Zhuge Liang, according to his dying wish, was buried on Mount Dingjun with a modest funeral and tomb, using no luxurious and expensive material. Liang was posthumously granted the title "Marquis Zhongwu" (忠武侯; literally "loyal and martial marquis") by Liu Shan. Zhuge Liang once wrote to Liu Shan promising that he would have a stoic life with no excessive and no luxurious assets as a model for the country. After Zhuge Liang's death, people had his property checked, which verified his claims.

The death of Zhuge Liang was widely mourned by the Shu Han people. Initially, the mourning and worship for Zhuge Liang was done arbitrarily by the people since neither official temple nor legal worship protocol for Zhuge Liang had been established yet, which upset the public opinion. Hence in spring 263, a temple for Zhuge Liang was built in Mianyang, near his tomb.

Family and descendants

Zhuge Liang's ancestor, Zhuge Feng, served as the Colonel-Director of Retainers during the reign of Emperor Yuan of the Han dynasty. Zhuge Liang's father, Zhuge Gui, served as an assistant officer in Mount Tai Commandery in the late Han dynasty. Zhuge Liang's cousin-uncle, Zhuge Xuan, who raised Zhuge Liang and Zhuge Jun, served as the Administrator of Yuzhang Commandery before serving under Liu Biao, the Governor of Jing Province.

Zhuge Liang had an elder brother, a younger brother, and two elder sisters. His elder brother, Zhuge Jin, served under the warlord Sun Quan and later in the state of Eastern Wu. His younger brother, Zhuge Jun, served in the state of Shu Han. One of Zhuge Liang's sisters married Pang Shanmin, a cousin of Pang Tong, while the other sister married a member of the prominent Kuai family headed by Kuai Liang and Kuai Yue in Xiangyang Commandery.

Zhuge Liang married the daughter of Huang Chengyan. She was a maternal niece of Liu Biao and Lady Cai because her mother (Huang Chengyan's wife) was Lady Cai's younger sister. Although her name was not recorded in history, she is commonly referred to by the name "Huang Yueying" in popular culture.

Zhuge Liang had at least two sons. His elder son, Zhuge Zhan, served as a general in Shu and was killed in action during the Conquest of Shu by Wei. His younger son, Zhuge Huai, lived as a commoner during the Jin dynasty. Zhuge Liang initially had no sons, so he adopted his nephew, Zhuge Qiao (Zhuge Jin's son). Zhuge Qiao served in Shu and died at a relatively young age. According to legend, Zhuge Liang had a daughter, Zhuge Guo, but her existence is disputed by historians.

Zhuge Qiao's son, Zhuge Pan, returned to Eastern Wu after Zhuge Ke's death to continue Zhuge Jin's family line there. Zhuge Zhan had three sons. The eldest, Zhuge Shang, served Shu and was killed in action together with his father. The second, Zhuge Jing, moved to Hedong Commandery in 264 with Zhuge Pan's son, Zhuge Xian, and came to serve the Jin dynasty later. The youngest was Zhuge Zhi.Some Chinese historians believe that Zhuge Zhi is just a fictional character.

Zhuge Dan, one of Zhuge Liang's cousins, served in the state of Cao Wei and masterminded the third of the Three Rebellions in Shouchun. He was killed after his defeat.

Legacy

Inventions
Although the invention of the repeating crossbow has often been attributed to Zhuge Liang, he had nothing to do with it. This misconception is based on a record attributing improvements to the multiple bolt crossbows to him.

Zhuge Liang is also credited with constructing the Stone Sentinel Maze, an array of stone piles that is said to produce supernatural phenomena, located near Baidicheng.

An early type of hot air balloon used for military signalling, known as the Kongming lantern, is also named after him. It was said to be invented by Zhuge Liang when he was trapped by Sima Yi in Pingyang. Friendly forces nearby saw the message on the lantern paper covering and came to Zhuge Liang's aid. Another belief is that the lantern resembled Zhuge Liang's headdress, so it was named after him.

Literary works
Some books popularly attributed to Zhuge Liang can be found today. For example, the Thirty-Six Stratagems, and Mastering the Art of War (not to be confused with Sun Tzu's The Art of War) are two commonly available works attributed to Zhuge Liang. Supposedly, his mastery of infantry and cavalry formation tactics, based on the Taoist classic I Ching, were unrivalled. His memorial, the Chu Shi Biao, written prior to the Northern Expeditions, provided a salutary reflection of his unwavering loyalty to the state of Shu. The memorial moved some readers to tears. In addition, he wrote Admonition to His Son in which he reflected on his humbleness and frugality in pursuit of a meaningful life.

Zhuge Liang is also the subject of many Chinese literary works. A poem by Du Fu, a prolific Tang dynasty poet, was written in memory of Zhuge Liang whose legacy of unwavering dedication seems to have been forgotten in Du Fu's generation (judging by the description of Zhuge Liang' unkept temple). Some historians believe that Du Fu had compared himself with Zhuge Liang in the poem. The full text is:

Another poem of Du Fu was also written to praise Zhuge Liang at his Baidicheng temple.

Du Fu's quatrain "Eightfold Battle Formation" about Zhuge Liang's Stone Sentinel Maze, is collected in the Three Hundred Tang Poems.

Notable quotes

The phrase "The Han and the Evil do not stand together" from the Later Chu Shi Biao is often used to draw a line in the sand and declare a situation where one cannot stand with evil. Notably, this phrase was Generalissimo Chiang Kai-shek's favorite quote to invoke to justify his anti-communism ideology.

Another phrase "with deference and prudence, to the state of one's depletion; it's never finished until one's death" from the Later Chu Shi Biao is often used to describe one's commitment and perseverance to strive to the utmost.

One famous line of poem, "Who is the first, awakened from the Great Dream? As always, I'm the one who knows.", was also attributed to Zhuge Liang.

"Without modest simplicity, one cannot brighten volition; Without tranquility and serenity, one cannot reach far", a well-known maxim authored by Zhuge Liang, has been popular in educational institutions in China for thousands of years.

In Romance of the Three Kingdoms

The wisdom of Zhuge Liang was popularised by the historical novel Romance of the Three Kingdoms, written by Luo Guanzhong during the Ming dynasty. In it, Zhuge Liang is described to be able to perform fantastical achievements such as summoning advantageous winds and devising magical stone mazes.

There is great confusion on whether the stories are historical or fictional. At least, the Empty Fort Strategy is based on historical records, albeit not attributed to Zhuge Liang historically. For Chinese people, the question is largely irrelevant, as the Zhuge Liang of lore is regardless seen as a mastermind, whose examples continue to influence many layers of Chinese society. They are also argued, together with Sun Tzu's The Art of War, to still greatly influence the modern Chinese strategical, military and everyday thinking.

See the following for the stories in Romance of the Three Kingdoms involving Zhuge Liang.
 Three visits to the thatched cottage
 Battle of Bowang
 Zhuge Liang's diplomatic mission to Jiangdong
 Borrowing arrows with straw boats
 Zhuge Liang summons an eastern wind
 Battle of Jiameng Pass
 Battle of Xiaoting
 Meng Huo captured and released seven times
 Empty fort strategy

Events before Zhuge Liang's death
When Zhuge Liang fell critically ill during the Battle of Wuzhang Plains, he attempted to extend his lifespan by 12 years through a ritual. However, he failed when the ritual was disrupted by Wei Yan, who rushed in to warn him about the enemy's advance. Before his death, Zhuge Liang also passed his 24 Volumes on Military Strategy to Jiang Wei, who would continue his legacy and lead another eleven campaigns against the state of Cao Wei.

Worship of Zhuge Liang
There are many temples and shrines built to commemorate Zhuge Liang. Some of the most famous ones include the Temple of the Marquis of Wu in Chengdu, and the Temple of the Marquis of Wu in Baidicheng.

In 760, when Emperor Suzong of the Tang dynasty built a temple to honour Jiang Ziya, he had sculptures of Zhuge Liang and another nine famous historical military generals/strategists – Bai Qi, Han Xin, Li Jing, Li Shiji, Zhang Liang, Tian Rangju, Sun Tzu, Wu Qi and Yue Yi – placed in the temple flanking Jiang Ziya's statue.

Zhuge Liang is also sometimes venerated as a door god at Chinese and Taoist temples, usually in partnership with Sima Yi of Wei.

In popular culture

Anime and Manga
Zhuge Liang is the protagonist of the seinen anime and manga series, Ya Boy Kongming!, where he is reborn in modern-day Tokyo shortly after his death.

Movie and television
Notable actors who have portrayed Zhuge Liang in Movie and television include: Adam Cheng, in The Legendary Prime Minister – Zhuge Liang (1985); Li Fazeng, in Zhuge Liang (1985); Tang Guoqiang, in Romance of the Three Kingdoms (1994); Pu Cunxin, in Three Kingdoms: Resurrection of the Dragon (2008); Takeshi Kaneshiro, in Red Cliff (2008–09); Lu Yi, in Three Kingdoms (2010); Raymond Lam, in Three Kingdoms RPG (2012); Wang Luoyong, in The Advisors Alliance (2017).

Video games
Zhuge Liang's reputation for being an unparalleled genius is also emphasised in his portrayal in video games. Reflecting his status as the most highly regarded strategist in Romance of the Three Kingdoms, games such as Destiny of an Emperor and Koei's Romance of the Three Kingdoms game series place Zhuge Liang's intelligence statistic as the highest of all characters. He is also a playable character in Koei's Dynasty Warriors, Dynasty Tactics and Kessen II. He also appears in Warriors Orochi, a crossover between Dynasty Warriors and Samurai Warriors.

Zhuge Liang is the protagonist in Koei's tactical role-playing game Sangokushi Koumeiden, where he can die at the Battle of Wuzhang Plains, as he did historically, or proceed to restore the Han dynasty under Emperor Xian.

Zhuge Liang appears in the turn-based strategy games Civilization IV and Civilization V as a great general along with Cao Cao.

Zhuge Liang appears as two separate spirits in the game Destiny of Spirits.

Zhuge Liang appears in at least two forms in the mobile game Puzzle & Dragons.

Zhuge Liang appears as a summonable Pseudo-Servant in the mobile game Fate/Grand Order, with most of his skills portraying him as a skilled tactician.

Zhuge Liang is featured in the sequel to Level-5's game and anime Inazuma Eleven GO 2: Chrono Stone, as well as Cao Cao, Liu Bei, Guan Yu and Zhang Fei. Notably, both adaptations portray Zhuge Liang as a woman.

Zhuge Liang is a legendary strategist in Creative Assembly's turn-based strategy game Total War: Three Kingdoms. In another videogame also produced by Creative Assembly, Total War: Warhammer III, a hot-air balloon unit used by Cathay (a faction based on China) was named after his courtesy name.

Zhuge Liang appears as a playable character in a mobile game Honkai Impact 3rd portrayed as a woman and being a powerful support.

Zhuge Liang is the fable hero of scholar class in the mobile game Royal Chaos, where he deals great amount of Area of Effect (AOE) damage as well as skilled in deployment.

See also

 Lists of people of the Three Kingdoms
 Wolonggang
 Zhuge Village

Notes

References

Citations

Bibliography

External links 

 Zhuge Liang style-name Kongming A history of Zhuge Liang and his writings. Including a guide to historic sites in China connected with Zhuge Liang
 
 

181 births
234 deaths
3rd-century heads of government
Ancient Chinese military engineers
Ancient Chinese military writers
Aviation pioneers
Chinese gods
Chinese inventors
Deified Chinese people
Engineers from Shandong
Han dynasty essayists
Han dynasty politicians from Shandong
Military strategists
Officials under Liu Bei
Politicians from Linyi
Shu Han essayists
Shu Han regents
Writers from Linyi
Legendary Chinese people